Richard Sahla (8 April 1900 – 6 April 1942) was a German equestrian. He competed in two events at the 1928 Summer Olympics. He was killed in action during World War II.

References

External links
 

1900 births
1942 deaths
German male equestrians
Olympic equestrians of Germany
Equestrians at the 1928 Summer Olympics
People from Bückeburg
German military personnel killed in World War II
Sportspeople from Lower Saxony